M4 is an EP recorded by Canadian indie rock band Faunts in 2006.

Track listing
"M4 (Part II)" – 8:18
"Sleepwalker" – 7:43
"M4 (Part I)" – 9:18
"Meno Mony Falls" – 5:54
"Of Nature" – 8:08

Music video
The first theatrically styled music video the band ever filmed was made for "M4 (Part II)". It was directed by Ryan Bosworth and came with a limited amount of hard-copy M4 EPs. The video features footage of the band playing interspersed with a visual representation of the song realized by a personified hierarchy of crabs, wherein a single crab wishes to dominate a space of sand dune on a beach. In the end, the single crab becomes the only one left but, reflecting the song's lyrics, the crab is devoured by a bigger predator than itself - a seagull.

Personnel
Faunts
Steven Batke – vocals, guitar
Tim Batke – vocals, guitar, keyboard
Joel Hitchcock – keyboard
Paul Arnusch – drums

Additional
 Engineer: Graham Lessard
 Mixed by Graham Lessard and Faunts
 Mastered by Phil Demetro
 Artwork Design by Tim Batke and Lindsay Batke

References

2007 EPs
Faunts albums